Lianghe may refer to the following locations in China:

 Lianghe County (梁河县), Dehong Prefecture, Yunnan
Townships (两河乡)
 Lianghe Township, Quanzhou County, Guangxi
 Lianghe Township, Pan County, in Pan County, Guizhou
 Lianghe Township, Pingshan County, Hebei
 Lianghe Township, Huayuan County, in Huayuan County, Hunan
 Lianghe Township, Zhashui County, in Zhashui County, Shaanxi
 Lianghe Township, Linshui County, in Linshui County, Sichuan
 Lianghe Township, Yiliang County, Zhaotong, in Yiliang County, Zhaotong, Yunnan